The North Eastern Province is one of the former provinces in Kenya. It has a land area of 127,358.5 km2, with its capital at Garissa. Previously known as the Northern Frontier District (NFD), the North Eastern Province territory was carved out of the present-day southern Somalia during the colonial period.

However, during negotiations for Kenya's independence, Britain granted administration of the NFD to Kenyan nationalists despite an informal plebiscite showing the overwhelming desire of the region's population to join the newly formed Somali Republic. It is, and has historically been, mostly inhabited by Somalis.

History

The Northern Frontier District came into being in 1925, when it was carved out of the present-day southern Somalia. At the time under British colonial administration, the northern half of Jubaland was ceded to Italy as a reward for the Italians' support of the Allies during World War I. Britain retained control of the southern half of the territory, which was later called the Northern Frontier District (subsequently renamed the North Eastern Province).

On 26 June 1960, four days before granting British Somaliland independence, the British government declared that all Somali-inhabited areas of East Africa, Greater Somalia should be unified in one administrative region. However, after the dissolution of the former British colonies in the region, Britain granted administration of the Northern Frontier District to Kenyan nationalists despite an informal plebiscite demonstrating the overwhelming desire of the region's population to join the newly formed Somali Republic, and the fact that the NFD was almost exclusively inhabited by ethnic Somalis.

In December 1962, at the urging of the Somalia government, the British appointed a commission to ascertain the desires of the inhabitants of the Northern Frontier District regarding its future. The commissioners reported that the inhabitants of five of the six administrative areas of the Northern Frontier District favored union with the Somali Republic. According to the Somali Republic, unification was favored by 88% of the inhabitants. Early in 1963, Britain assured Somalia that no decision would be made regarding the Northern Frontier District without prior consultation with the Republic. However, Britain did not follow the wishes of the overwhelming majority of the inhabitants of the Northern Frontier District and cede the territory to the Somalia Republic. Instead, on 8 March 1963, Britain announced the creation of the North East Region out of the Northern Frontier District. Unsatisfied with this solution, the Somali Republic severed diplomatic relations with the United Kingdom on 18 March 1963.

On the eve of Kenya's independence in August 1963, British officials belatedly realized that the new Kenyan regime was not willing to give up the Somali-inhabited areas it had just been granted administration of. Led by the Northern Province People's Progressive Party (NPPPP), Somalis in the NFD vigorously sought union with their kin in the Somali Republic to the north.

In response, the Kenyan government enacted a number of repressive measures designed to frustrate their efforts in what came to be known as the shifta period: Somali leaders were routinely placed in preventive detention, where they remained well into the late 1970s. The North Eastern Province was closed to general access (along with other parts of Kenya) as a "scheduled" area (ostensibly closed to all outsiders, including members of parliament, as a means of protecting the nomadic inhabitants), and news from it was very difficult to obtain. A number of reports, however, accused the Kenyans of mass slaughters of entire villages of Somali citizens and of setting up large "protected villages"—in effect concentration camps. The government refused to acknowledge the ethnically based irredentist motives of the Somalis, making constant reference in official statements to the shifta (bandit) problem in the area.

Although the main conflict ended in a cease-fire in 1967, Somalis in the region still identify and maintain close ties with their brethren in Somalia. They have traditionally married within their own community and formed a cohesive ethnic network.

Demographics

As of 2009, the North Eastern Province had a population of 2,310,757 residents.  These census results were however nullified by the then Planning Minister Wycliffe Oparanya citing inconsistencies in the birth and death rates.
On 21 March 2016, the court of appeal in Nairobi, declared the disputed 2009 census results valid. The North Eastern Province is predominantly inhabited by ethnic Somalis.

The Somalis who live in North Eastern Province of Greater Somalia in the present day Kenya are close to three million (3,000,000) in the 2019 Kenya National Census with another 400,000 Somalia refugees in several Kenya refugee camps.

Administration
North Eastern Province has thirteen constituencies represented in the National Assembly of Kenya Now under the Government of Kenya whose Regional Commissioner sits in Garissa. The Current Regional Commissioner is Mohamed Birik

As the capital of Garissa County, Garissa is the seat of the County Government of Garissa as well as the County Assembly. The town is represented by Aden Bare Duale, a Somali Member of Parliament for the Garissa Township Constituency and who also  doubles as the  Leader of the Majority in the legislature. He was appointed to the position in the 2013 general elections. The county is also home to Ijara, Dadaab, Lagdera, Fafi and Balambala constituencies.

Wajir is the largest county in the former North Eastern Province with approximately an area of 56,000km2. The county has six constituencies. They include Eldas, Tarbaj, Wajir East, Wajir North, Wajir West,  and Wajir South.

Mandera County is at the furthermost bordering both the Somalia and Ethiopia's Somali Region. It has six constituencies just like the rest of the counties in the North Eastern province. These constituencies include Banissa, Lafey, Mandera East, Mandera North, Mandera South, Mandera West and Takaba.

Economy

Livestock and agricultural production is a significant part of the region's economy. Between 2005 and 2007, Garissa cattle producers earned over 1.8 billion shillings in sales in domestic and overseas markets. Construction on a new abattoir also began in October 2007. In terms of livestock imports, most of Garissa's cattle comes from cross-border trade between Somali livestock merchants.

Transportation
North Eastern Province is served by the Wajir Airport. It handles about seven flights per day. As of September 2012, civil flights are offered twice a week by Echo. Most flights, however, are cargo. Some charter and military flights are additionally accommodated.

Climate and habitat
North Eastern Province has a semi-arid and hot desert climate (Köppen BSh and BWh). Rain falls infrequently, usually only around April or October, and quite sporadically from year to year. Although the southwestern section of the Somali autonomous region is extremely fertile where the Tana River is located with a lot of farming.

There is a major river called Tana River which is located in the southwestern section of the region. Wildlife in the area include the lion, elephant, buffalo, zebra, hyena, gazelle, giraffe, leopard, cheetah, and ostrich. Hippopotamus and crocodiles are mainly located on the river.

Counties

After 2007

See also
Greater Somalia
Shakani

References

External links

Somalia-Ethiopia, Kenya Conflict

 
Provinces of Kenya
Former provinces
2013 disestablishments in Kenya
Somali-speaking countries and territories